Kitty Kelly, M.D. is a 1919 American silent comedy-drama film directed by Howard Hickman and starring Bessie Barriscale, Jack Holt and Joseph J. Dowling.

Cast
 Bessie Barriscale as Dr. Kitty Kelly 
 Jack Holt as Bob Lang 
 Joseph J. Dowling as Sheriff 
 Wedgwood Nowell as Jerry Williams 
 Mildred Manning as Lola

References

Bibliography
 Leonhard Gmür. Rex Ingram: Hollywood's Rebel of the Silver Screen. 2013.

External links
 
lantern slide(Wayback Machine)

1919 films
1919 comedy-drama films
American silent feature films
Films directed by Howard Hickman
American black-and-white films
Film Booking Offices of America films
1910s English-language films
1910s American films
Silent American comedy-drama films